Canadian lawyer barbara findlay  is a longtime LGBT rights activist. She is the subject of the documentary in particular, barbara findlay.

Early life 
Findlay has a BA from Queen's University. She later studied at the University of British Columbia, obtaining both a Master of Arts in sociology and an LLB.

In the 1960s, findlay was admitted to a psychiatric ward against her will during her first year of university for admitting she was attracted to women.

Career 
Findlay was called to the bar in 1977. She began practicing law soon after Canada's decriminalization of homosexuality.

Findlay is a founding member of the Sexual Orientation and Gender Identity Conference (SOGIC), a queer lawyer group that is part of the Canadian Bar Association, and the December 9 Coalition. She is also a member of Alliance of Women Against Racism Etc. (AWARE).

Findlay has a law practice in British Columbia specializing in family law for LGBT and child custody cases. She has been involved in many cases centring around trans rights, including Kimberley Nixon v. Vancouver Rape Relief Society.

Findlay's life and career are chronicled in the documentary in particular, barbara findlay. The film was directed by Becca Pluce.

Findlay has also led workshops at Room Magazine's literary festival, Growing Room. She is featured in Making Room: Forty Years of Room Magazine in the photo essay "The Cancer Year" (with Dorothy Elias).

Personal life 
Findlay lives with her partner, Sheila Gilhooly, in British Columbia. She describes herself as "a white, cisgender, lesbian, activist lawyer with physical disabilities".

Awards 
In 2001, findlay was appointed to the Queen's Counsel. In 2005, she was given an award of merit from the Sexual Diversity Studies Department at the University of Toronto. In 2013, findlay was awarded a Queen's Diamond Jubilee Medal.

Notes

References 

21st-century Canadian lawyers
20th-century Canadian lawyers
Lawyers in British Columbia
Canadian women lawyers
Canadian King's Counsel
Queen's University at Kingston alumni
Peter A. Allard School of Law alumni
Living people
Date of birth missing (living people)
Lesbian feminists
Canadian lesbians
Canadian people with disabilities
20th-century women lawyers
21st-century women lawyers
Year of birth missing (living people)
20th-century Canadian LGBT people
21st-century Canadian LGBT people